Herbert "Bertie" Thorne Phillips (20 June 1883 – 5 August 1977) was a South African athlete who competed at the 1908 Summer Olympics in London. He was born and died in Pretoria. In the 100 metres, Phillips did not finish his first round heat.

References

Sources
 
 
 

1883 births
1977 deaths
Sportspeople from Pretoria
South African male sprinters
Olympic athletes of South Africa
Athletes (track and field) at the 1908 Summer Olympics
19th-century South African people
20th-century South African people